"60 Miles an Hour" is a song by English musical group New Order, released as the second single from their seventh studio album, Get Ready. Released on 19 November 2001, it entered the UK Singles Chart at number 29 and reached number 37 in Australia the following year.

The cover model is German actress Nicolette Krebitz, looking at the viewer through a worn out hole in her t-shirt.

Track listings

Charts

References

2001 singles
2001 songs
London Records singles
New Order (band) songs
Song recordings produced by David Kahne
Songs written by Bernard Sumner
Songs written by Gillian Gilbert
Songs written by Peter Hook
Songs written by Stephen Morris (musician)